Aleksandr Sinyavsky (born 9 March 1977) is a Belarusian ski jumper. He competed at the 1994 Winter Olympics and the 1998 Winter Olympics.

References

1977 births
Living people
Belarusian male ski jumpers
Olympic ski jumpers of Belarus
Ski jumpers at the 1994 Winter Olympics
Ski jumpers at the 1998 Winter Olympics
Place of birth missing (living people)